Roland Pap (born 17 August 1990 in Bonyhád) is a Hungarian football player who currently plays for Paksi SE.

Club statistics

Updated to games played as of 1 December 2013.

References
HLSZ
MLSZ

1990 births
Living people
People from Bonyhád
Hungarian footballers
Association football forwards
Paksi FC players
Vác FC players
Kozármisleny SE footballers
Nemzeti Bajnokság I players
Sportspeople from Tolna County